Margarita Voites (until 1959 Lombak; born on 30 October 1936 in Moscow) is an Estonian opera singer (coloratura soprano).

Margarita Voites was born Margarita Lombak in Moscow. Her father, Arthur Richard Lombak, an Estonian, was an artillery engineer and later a lecturer of Marxism-Leninism. Her mother, Tamara Lombak, was of Russian and Polish origin. The family later settled in Novosibirsk where Voites began attending school, before returning to Estonia, where she continued her studies in Viljandi and Tartu. After graduating from Tartu City Secondary School No. 2 (now, the Miina Härma Gymnasium), she enrolled at the Faculty of History and Language of Tartu State University, to study bibliography. In 1957, she appeared at the on the university's stage in the main role of Imre Kálmán's operetta Das Veilchen vom Montmartre. She was soon after encouraged to leave the university and enter the class of Linda Saul, an associate professor at the Tallinn Conservatory for vocal training. She graduating in 1964.

From 1964 until 1969, she was a soloist at Vanemuine theatre, and 1969 until 1990 at the Estonia Theatre.

Awards
 1969: Meritorious Artist of the Estonian SSR
 2011: Order of the White Star, III class.

Opera roles

 Frasquita (Bizet "Carmen", 1963 in Estonia Theatre)
 Violetta (Verdi "Traviata", 1964 and 1974, also in Bolshoi Theatre in 1973)
 Margarethe (Gounod "Faust", 1965)

References

Living people
1936 births
Estonian operatic sopranos
20th-century Estonian women opera singers
Estonian musical theatre actresses
Miina Härma Gymnasium alumni
University of Tartu alumni
Recipients of the Order of the White Star, 3rd Class
Estonian Academy of Music and Theatre alumni
Estonian people of Russian descent
Estonian people of Polish descent
Musicians from Tartu